Isaac Aboagye (born 27 December 1995) is a Ghanaian cricketer. He was named in Ghana's squad for the 2017 ICC World Cricket League Division Five tournament in South Africa. He played in Ghana's opening fixture, against Germany, on 3 September 2017.

In April 2018, he captained Ghana during the 2018–19 ICC World Twenty20 Africa Qualifier tournament. He finished the tournament as Ghana's leading wicket-taker, with eight dismissals in five games.

In May 2019, he was named as the captain of Botswana's squad for the Regional Finals of the 2018–19 ICC T20 World Cup Africa Qualifier tournament in Uganda. He made his Twenty20 International (T20I) debut for Ghana against Namibia on 20 May 2019.

References

External links
 

1995 births
Living people
Ghanaian cricketers
Ghana Twenty20 International cricketers
Place of birth missing (living people)